Main Event Entertainment is an American chain of family entertainment centers. Headquartered in Lewisville, Texas, it operates 53 locations in 17 states, predominantly in the Southern United States, and feature attractions and features such as bowling alleys, arcades, and restaurants among others.

Formerly owned by Ardent Leisure, Main Event was sold to its competitor Dave & Busters in June 2022, with Main Event's CEO Chris Morris becoming CEO of the combined company. Main Event will operate as a complement to the more adult-oriented Dave & Buster's chain.

History 

Main Event was founded in 1998.

In 2018, Chris Morris replaced Charlie Keegan as president and CEO of the company.

In June 2020, Main Event's parent company Ardent Leisure sold a 24.2% stake in the company to RedBird Capital Partners.

On April 6, 2022, Dave & Buster's announced its intent to acquire Main Event for $835 million, with Main Event's CEO Chris Morris becoming the chief executive of the combined company. Interim Dave and Buster's CEO Kevin Sheehan considered Main Event to be complementary to the main Dave & Buster's chain, citing that the two chains were positioned towards different demographics (families and young adults respectively), and that Main Event had a focus on larger-scale activities and attractions. The acquisition was completed in June 2022; Sheehan, who became chairman at that time, stated that larger Dave & Buster's locations could be converted to Main Event to take better advantage of their floorspace, and that new, smaller Dave & Buster's locations could be built in the same market to supplant them.

Operations 
Main Event Entertainment operates family entertainment centers which feature billiards, bowling, arcade games, virtual reality games, laser tag, mini golf, gravity ropes course, and karaoke. Main Event offers facilities and services for birthday parties. The company also provides food and beverage, as well as meeting and event space with accommodations for corporate meetings or group gatherings; and event facility rental services.

Each Main Event location offers full restaurant services, with items like appetizers, pizza, hamburgers, salads, and unique desserts. Each location also has a full-service bar, serving beer, wine, mixed drinks, and a bar menu.

References

Further reading 

 
 
 
 https://www.bizjournals.com/dallas/blog/morning_call/2015/02/main-event-entertainment-plans-new-look-prototype.html
 https://www.bizjournals.com/louisville/news/2015/07/13/dont-call-it-a-bowling-alley-main-event-will.html
 
 https://www.forbes.com/sites/joanverdon/2020/05/19/bowling-valets-and-socially-distant-laser-tag-main-event-arcades-reopen-with-new-rules/?sh=25dd93872476 
 
 https://www.bizjournals.com/houston/news/2013/01/08/main-event-to-open-stafford-location.html

See also 
 Chuck E. Cheese

External links 
 

1998 establishments in Texas
Entertainment companies of the United States
Companies based in Plano, Texas
2022 mergers and acquisitions